Gökçekısık station is a station near the village of Gökçekısık, Eskişehir in Turkey.

TCDD Taşımacılık operates five trains that stop at the station: the Izmir Blue Train, Pamukkale Express, Eskişehir-Tavşanlı Regional, Eskişehir-Kütahya Regional and the Eskişehir-Afyon Regional. Only the Izmir-bound Izmir Blue Train stops at the station while the Eskişehir-bound train does not.

References

External links
Station timetable

Railway stations in Eskişehir Province
Railway stations opened in 1894
1894 establishments in the Ottoman Empire
Transport in Eskişehir Province